Top Country Albums is a chart that ranks the top-performing country music albums in the United States, published by Billboard.  In 1981, 12 different albums topped the chart, which was at the time published under the title Top Country LPs, based on sales reports submitted by a representative sample of stores nationwide.

In the issue of Billboard dated January 3, Kenny Rogers was at number one with his album Greatest Hits, its seventh week in the top spot.  Rogers returned to the top of the chart in August with Share Your Love and was one of four artists to achieve two number ones in 1981, along with Ronnie Milsap, Willie Nelson and Eddie Rabbitt.  Rogers had achieved great success since 1978, with the smooth production of his records appealing to both country and pop audiences.  In less than four years he had achieved eight number one albums, but his chart placings would begin to decline in the 1980s and, even though he would continue to record well into the 21st century, he would only gain two more number ones.

In May the band Alabama gained its first number one with the album Feels So Right.  After an initial spell of two weeks in the top spot, the album would go on to make repeated returns to number one for the remainder of the year.  By the end of 1981 it had spent a total of 17 weeks atop the chart, the most by any album during the year.  It would continue to return to number one in the first half of 1982 and would achieve a final total of 28 weeks at number one, a new record for the country albums chart.  The first band to achieve stardom in country music, a genre traditionally dominated by solo artists, Alabama would go on to become the most successful country act of the 1980s, with more than 25 chart-topping singles.  Feels So Right was the first of ten number-one albums which the group achieved in the 1980s, a run interrupted only by the seasonal album Christmas in 1985.  The Oak Ridge Boys also topped the chart for the first time in 1981.  The group had originated as a gospel act which first recorded in 1947 before switching to country music in the 1970s and reaching its commercial peak in the first half of the 1980s.  Fancy Free was the first of three chart-topping albums which the group achieved in this period and the biggest-selling of its career.

Chart history

References

1981
1981 record charts